The Embassy of the State of Palestine in France is the diplomatic mission of the Palestine in France. It is located in 14, Rue du Commandant Léandri in Paris.

See also

List of diplomatic missions in France.
List of diplomatic missions of Palestine.

References

France
Palestine
France–State of Palestine relations